Dean Willey (born  in Rotherham) is a British male former weightlifter.

Weightlifting career
Willey competed in the 67.5 kg category and represented Great Britain at international competitions. He won the bronze medal in the snatch at the 1984 World Weightlifting Championships lifting 140.0 kg. He participated at the 1984 Summer Olympics in the 67.5 kg event and also at the 1988 Summer Olympics.

He represented England and won a gold medal in the 60 kg featherweight, at the 1982 Commonwealth Games in Brisbane, Queensland, Australia. Four years later he won a second gold medal in the heavier category of 67.5 kg lightweight, when representing England at the 1986 Commonwealth Games in Edinburgh, Scotland.

References

External links
 

1962 births
Living people
British male weightlifters
World Weightlifting Championships medalists
People from Rotherham
Olympic weightlifters of Great Britain
Weightlifters at the 1984 Summer Olympics
Weightlifters at the 1988 Summer Olympics
Weightlifters at the 1982 Commonwealth Games
Weightlifters at the 1986 Commonwealth Games
Commonwealth Games medallists in weightlifting
Commonwealth Games gold medallists for England
Medallists at the 1982 Commonwealth Games
Medallists at the 1986 Commonwealth Games